(viz. :  and  and ), also known as  when it is decorated with outside pendulums, and , refers to two types of traditional  or (-structured)  which were worn as outer robes by men in the broad sense; i.e. the casual  in  and the priests’ , in the broad sense. As a specific term, the  refers to the former. The term "" can also be a specific term which refers to the long black or yellow robe worn by Buddhist monks.   

The  was also introduced in both Japan and Korea where Chinese Buddhism had been spread.

Origins and history 
The Buddhist monk's  was worn as early as the Tang dynasty. The term  was borrowed from the term Kasaya in China where it became a specific term to refer to a one-piece rectangular robe made out of patchwork. The  was typically black in colour in the Han dynasty; purple in the Tang dynasty and turned yellow since the Five dynasties period until now as the colour yellow in Buddhism represents the highest set of values: desire-less-ness, humility, and renunciation. In China, there were also regulations established by the Imperial court which regulated the colour of the  based on ranks but which could vary depending on the different dynastic period.

The wearing of the  together with the  eventually became the standard dressing style for Buddhist monks and continued to prevail in the Song, Yuan, and Ming dynasties with little changes in styles. The custom and practice of wearing  over the  then spread to Korea and Japan. In present-days, the Tang dynasty-style  which is purple in colour still remains popular among the Japanese Buddhist monks. 

During the early Qing dynasty, the Qing court issued the  policies on the Han Chinese population, which led to the disappearance of most . The  was, however, spared from this policy as it was part of the ten exceptions. In the Qing dynasty, the  stopped being used and the Buddhist monk's  was used alone.

Buddhist robes 
When Buddhism was introduced in China during the Han dynasty around 65 AD, the Indian Kasaya was also introduced. However, the Indian Kasaya was not well-received in China as the Chinese deeply believed in the Confucian concept of propriety; and as a result, any forms of body exposure was perceived as being improper and was associated with barbarians. Being fully clothed is an expression of Chinese clothing culture, and compared to their Indian counterparts, the Chinese did not perceive the exposure of shoulders as a sign of respect. The absence of right shoulder exposure started in northern China in order to shield the body from the cold and to fulfill the Chinese cultural requirements. This change occurred during the Chinese medieval era with the bareness completely disappearing in the Cao Wei period. It appears that shoulder exposure reappeared during the Northern Wei period before being criticized:

The  was a piece of fabric which covers the right shoulder of Buddhist nuns and was only used by the nuns; it started to be used after some Buddhist nuns suffered harassment by men for wearing right shoulder-exposing clothes.

In accordance to the philosophy of Confucianism and Taoism, the use of upper and lower garment, represented the Heaven and Earth which interacts in harmony; this concept appeared early on in ancient China and can be found in the 《》. By the time of the Yuan dynasty, this long robe was termed . The term  can also be found in a 1336 monastic code called the 《》, compiled by Dongyang Dehui in 1338 during the Yuan dynasty.

The wearing of these long robes by Buddhist monks is a legacy of the Tang and Song period.

The  originated from the -style worn in the Han and Tang dynasties. During the Tang and Song period, the Indian-style Kasaya went through major changes until they did not have the same style as the original Kasaya anymore. The  however maintains some traces of traditional Chinese culture and shows some glimpse of the dress which had been worn by the elites in ancient China.

Casual  
According to Shen Congwen's 《 – 》, the  evolved from the  worn by the ancient monks. 

In the Song dynasty, the casual  was loose with a central seam at the back; it however lacked slits on its lower part.

Types of

Casual  /  
The casual  was popular among men of the Song, Yuan and Ming dynasties, it could be worn by both scholar-official and the common people, and has several features:

 The bottom of robe reaches below the knee
 With overlapping  collar 
 A centre back seam which runs down the robe
 With lateral slit on each lower side

Priests’ 
The priests’  was generally worn by a Mahāyāna or Taoist priest, it had been popular since the Song dynasty, and has another several features:

 With loose cuffs
 With black borders around the edges of robe
 With a lan on the waistline of robe

The  is a style worn by Buddhist monastic and laity who pay homage to the Buddha. It is characterized with wide and loose sleeves, along with wide loose waist and lower hem; these features made them comfortable to wear.

It can also be found in dark blue.

Derivatives and influences

Japan 
The  is worn by Japanese Buddhist monks or priests; the robe is typically black or blue.

Korea 
During the Three Kingdoms period, Buddhism was introduced to Korea through China, and the Korean Buddhist monks wore Chinese style Buddhist robes, which is the Chinese-style . The  worn by the Korean Buddhist monks was worn as early as the Goryeo period.

The  developed in one of the current Korean, long-sleeved Buddhist .

Similar items 

 Daopao
 Paofu
 Shenyi

See also
Han Chinese clothing
List of Han Chinese clothing

References

Chinese traditional clothing